Manuel Ugarte Soto (born 1940) is a Chilean police officer and lawyer who served as General Director of Carabineros de Chile during the periods of Eduardo Frei Ruíz-Tagle and Ricardo Lagos.

Early life
After finishing his studies at the Liceo Barros Borgoño, he entered the Escuela de Carabineros. He graduated as a second lieutenant when he was twenty.

Works
 Por verdes senderos del deber (2001; «By the green paths of the duty»)

References

External Links
 Report at Punto Final 

1940 births
Living people 
Pontifical Catholic University of Valparaíso alumni
Carabineros de Chile
General Directors of Carabineros de Chile